MCI Capital SA - private equity fund listed on the Warsaw Stock Exchange (WSE: MCI) established in 1999 by Tomasz Czechowicz with assets under management (AUM) of 2.8 billion PLN (ca. 600 m Euro) and permanent capital of 1.8 billion PLN [ca. 400 m Euro) as of December 31, 2021. According to Wall Street Journal MCI is one of Poland’s leading private equity companies. 

MCI Capital specializes in digital economy buyout and growth capital investments, seeking to deploy EUR 30-100 million per investment. MCI operates across Europe, with a particular emphasis on Central Europe. Historically, MCI Group has also managed funds dedicated to investments in private debt, growth equity, and venture capital.

Business activity 
The total value of gross assets under the management of MCI – increased by available financing for investment activities (financial commitments) – as at June 30, 2022 was approximately PLN 2.8 billion.
Throughout its history, MCI has made a total of 107 investments and over 73 divestments.
Since the start of its operations on January 1, 1999, MCI has delivered an 18 percent average annual increase in NAV per share and an internal rate of return of 27 percent on its growth and private equity portfolio. 

MCI Capital ASI SA is a member of the Polish Association of Capital Investors. 

Key people at the company include: Tomasz Czechowicz, founder and managing partner; Zbigniew Jagiełło, head of the supervisory board (previously the longstanding president of PKO Bank Polski); and Ewa Ogryczak, senior partner and chief operating officer.

MCI Capital focuses on investments in companies operating in the following segments:

 SaaS and B2B software
 e-commerce, direct-to-customer and marketplaces (B2C/B2B)
 payments, fintech and insurtech
 digital infrastructure
 energy and retail digital transformation

Investments are typically pursued through recapitalizations from venture capital and private equity funds, carveouts from strategic investors, public-to-private transactions, and founder-owner transitions.

Selected exits from investments 

 iZettle (Sweden) – sale of the company to PayPal for over $2 billion – one of the largest fintech exits in Europe.
 RemoteMyApp (Poland) - sale of the global gaming platform to Intel Corporation (Intel's first strategic acquisition in Poland).
 ATMan (Poland) - sale of shares in a data center operator to an investment vehicle managed by Goldmans Sachs Merchant Banking Division.
 Lifebrain (Italy) - sale to Investindustrial, a European private equity fund.
 WP.pl (Poland) - sale of the entire block of shares by Orange to the O2 Group, which sold part of its shares to the MCI fund, debut on the Warsaw Stock Exchange (record capitalization of EUR 800 million).
 Netrisk (Hungary) - implementation of the "buy & build" strategy to build a leading European insurance leader, recapitalization with TA Associates.
 Dotcard (Poland) - sale of one of the Polish leaders in the e-payment market for PLN 315 million to a strategic investor - Nexi Group/Nets, a digital leader on the European market.
 Mall.cz (Czech Republic) - recapitalization of an e-commerce store with a venture capital fund and sale to Allegro.
 Invia (Czech Republic) - recapitalization of the e-travel platform with a venture capital fund, sale to the Rockaway Group for PLN 327 million.
 Azimo (Great Britain) - MCI partially exited the investment, while also becoming a shareholder in a global provider of HR tech solutions – Papaya Global.

Current portfolio and new investments
MCI currently holds shares in 14 portfolio companies and, in line with its investment strategy, plans to implement 2-3 new investments annually.

History 
 1999: Establishment of MCI as a digital investor operating in Poland and Central and Eastern Europe
 1999: the first investment in CCS (Computer Communication Systems SA – one of the leading Polish ICT systems integrators)
 2001: MCI debuts on the WSE, assets under management worth USD 10 million
 2008: entry into growth capital investing
 2008: entry into leveraged buyout investing (ABC Data)
 2010: EUR 100 million of net assets under management
 2011: entry into private debt investing
 2012: entry into Western European market
 2014: EUR 300 million net assets under management
 2019: Refocus of strategy on buyout transactions across Europe via its evergreen MCI.EuroVentures fund.
 2021: Record-breaking profit for MCI – PLN 465.79 million of consolidated net profit.

References

Financial services companies established in 1999
Financial services companies of Poland
Companies listed on the Warsaw Stock Exchange
1999 establishments in Poland